James Sunderland may refer to:

James Sunderland (politician) (born 1970), British Conservative Party politician
James Sunderland, central character of the video game Silent Hill 2